Dissaving is negative saving. If spending is greater than disposable income, dissaving is taking place. This spending is financed by already accumulated savings, such as money in a savings account, or it can be borrowed. Household dissaving therefore corresponds to an absolute decrease in their financial investments.

Usually dissavings start after retirement, when an individual starts deducting money from the amount that he has been saving during his life time. There are also other reasons for dissavings; like big purchases, huge events, and emergencies. 
On the macro level, also governments could reach a certain situation where they start dissaving from their accumulated funds.

Why people save
Savings is when an income contributor keeps a certain amount of the income on a side (saving account) and start having an accumulative amount of money based on their savings. People usually save money for certain reasons such as: 
1- Emergencies are those unexpected emerging events that might happen in a persons life and that might need a certain amount of money in order for it to be satisfied/solved (such as a health emergency, unexpected damage in some equipment, etc…). In such cases, having financial security can help reduces the chances of borrowing money or taking loans. 
2- Kids education is one of the most crucial choices on an households future, therefore parents usually worry about their kids educations and are always willing save money for the increasing educational fees, or potential improvement in the degree obtained. 
4- Big purchases like cars, house, or equipments wouldn’t be easily to be bought without any saved amount as sometimes they might constitute of more than 1.5 times of the monthly salary. Buying big purchases fills the satisfaction of the buyer depending on his/her preferences and willingness, leading to an improved well-being situation.
5- Accumulating wealth or increasing the cash reserves also help invest some money at the bank where the investor would be getting a certain interest rate on his/her saving account. 
Once an individual starts deducting a certain amount of money for any of these purposes, in addition to daily  expenses, here starts the dissaving process.

Why people dissave
There are multiple reasons why people dissave. The first one is that a person accumulates savings for the purpose of spending them after retirement. This type of dissaving is intentional and voluntary and requires planning how much to save and dissave in order not to run out of money in their savings. Another reason is that a person experiences a shock, e.g. sudden unemployment or medical emergency and is forced to spend more than they earn. This person first dissaves from their personal savings and possibly later has to borrow money to finance their expenses. Third reason is that a person lacks judgment and lives above their means. These people finance their spendings from credit and are the most prone to shocks which may lead to personal bankruptcy.
We can also assimilate a request for credit to early dissaving. Indeed, a household that has a consumer credit for the acquisition of a good commits to repay the loan and the interest on its future income, which reduces its future savings.

Dissaving was reported as a typical response to deficits, for households with normal income and expenditure patterns during the depression of the 1930s.
Although this phenomenon is very rare at the collective level, it is quite common at the individual level since, the purpose of savings is to one day be used for consumer purchases. With a phenomenon of dissaving at the collective level would be bad for the economy of a country since it is used for financing. Zero savings would practically prevent the financing of new investments and therefore potential growth. Dismissals at the collective level would have even more important consequences because the decrease in outstanding investments would lead to a drop in the quotations of financial securities (stocks and bonds) and would risk putting the banks and the systems of collecting savings into bankruptcy. following a liquidity crisis. Massive dissaving to consumption can also lead to inflation risks if the production of consumer goods is not sufficient to meet new demand.

Saving and dissaving lifecycle

The life-cycle approach of the saving and dissaving decisions
Lowest tier people with the lowest income tent to save little while they are still working, which leads to a little dissavings as a consequence after their retirement. Even if they were somehow fortunate and could save some amount of money during their working/production life, they would still have few savings that they would consume in few months. (Low savings, low dissavings) 
Highest tier people with the highest income are considered to have high amount of savings, which in contract, they tend to dissave less. Such dissavings happen when they face health diseases, or when they have to pay some long-term expenses. (High savings, low dissavings)
Middle tier people who have middle income, they show some aspects of savings and dissavings during their life-cycle, specially when we think about pensions and health shocks or diseases we can see that medium income people try to save as much as they can during their life-cycle, and once they face a health shock or when they start getting less pension, a significant drop in the saving account can be noticed, which means an increase in the dissavings.

Inflation and dissavings
Another reason of dissaving is that when an individual is expecting an increase in the inflation rate, they would be willing to consume more and more of the current saved account as they expecting the value of money to be less.

Dissaving at the retirement age

 People at the age of 20 when they start working and making income their income curve starts exceeding the consumption line which is when they start saving money. Until they reach the retirement age which is 65, their income curve start receding the consumption curve which is where dissaving start taking place;  this is mainly when an elder start deducting from his saving amounts for his daily expenses and other emergencies.

Governments dissavings
Dissavings can also occur on the macroeconomic level, that’s when the government tend to spend all the accumulated savings and the available funds, specially when a natural disaster happens such as an earthquake, wildfire, or hurricane. 
Other causes might be due to civil disorders, hyperinflation, or war.

A real example of dissaving
In December 2019 until January 2019, when the US faced a governmental shutdown, most of the governmental employees were forced to take an unpaid leave from their work. The consequence of this forced unpaid leave is that these employees started to dissave just to keep up with their daily living expenses and basic obligations, even if it wasn’t their fault.
Intro 

The life-cycle hypothesis of saving, of Ando and Modigliani, proposes that people work and save when they are young and retire and dissave when they become elderly.
However, this theory is not fully verified, at least in France. The savings rate is falling due to the aging of the population. In fact, the savings rate continues to increase beyond the age of 50, reaching 22.5% for those over 60. This phenomenon is undoubtedly explained in part by the concern to pass on wealth to subsequent generations as well as to cover unforeseen health expenses.

Relevant studies
Hayashi, Ando, and Ferris investigated whether the elderly save or dissave and found for the United States that families after retirement dissave on average about a third of their peak wealth by the time of death, leaving the rest (mostly their homes) as bequests. In contrast they found that for Japan the elderly forming independent households and those living with children continue to save, for all but the most elderly. From age 80 or more and, also the single elderly of all ages, the dissaving patterns were evident.

Later evidence presented by Horioka reinforces the life cycle hypothesis in Japan.

Clara Fernström researched whether there is any correlation between the dissaving of a person and the person’s age, gender, marital status, income and the probability of surviving until the following year. Her study shows following results and provides possible explanation as follows:
 Annual savings increase with lower survival probability. That might be explained by either bequest motives or the low utility rate of consumption for a person with low survival probability. Person with low survival probability is likely to be ill and not able to enjoy the consumption as much as a healthy person, therefore they decide to consume little.
 People with low income show less dissaving after a shock than people with high income. People with low income usually have low savings, therefore don’t have the possibility to dissave without borrowing. However, people with high savings can choose how much to dissave.
 People with children save more than childless people, which is explained by wanting to leave a bequest for their offspring.
 Married individuals save less than the singles. Unlike people with children, there seems to be no visible intent to save for bequest reasons. Moreover, it is possible that the utility rate of consumption is higher for married individuals, as the utility is shared with their spouse. Moreover, single people save more, because they can’t rely financially on their husband or wife.
 Older people dissave less than younger people, which is probably linked to the fact that older people have generally lower probability of survival.

See also
 Autonomous consumption
 Debt
 Retirement spend down

References

External links
  Steven Haider, Michael Hurd, Elaine Reardon and Stephanie Williamson, "Patterns of Dissaving in Retirement", AARP, 2000.

Personal finance